Johannes Fiebag (1956–1999) was a German writer.

1956 births
1999 deaths
German male writers